Kizu may refer to:

Kizu (band), a Japanese rock band
Kizu, Kyoto, a former town in Sōraku District, Kyoto Prefecture, Japan
Kizu Station (disambiguation), multiple railway stations in Japan

People with the surname
, Japanese photographer
, Japanese rugby union player

Japanese-language surnames